Henry Staunton (born 20 May 1948), is a British businessman, the chairman of British retailer, WH Smith and the former Finance Director of Granada Group and ITV plc.

Named in The Times 2006 Power 100 survey, and rated as one of the UK's top 50 finance movers and shakers by Accountancy Age, Staunton is an "experienced finance professional" and "well regarded dealmaker". While at Granada, he helped steer one of the largest mergers in media history - creating a unified ITV - and played a role in ensuring Granada and its executives came out on top after the £5.8bn deal to merge Carlton and Granada.

He sits on the boards of insurer Legal & General, The Merchants Trust plc, Standard Bank and property investment and development company Capital & Counties Properties.

Education and early career
Staunton attended Ipswich School before reading Economics and Statistics at the University of Exeter. In 1970, he joined auditing firm Price Waterhouse: he was admitted as a partner in 1981, later becoming Senior Audit Partner, looking after a number of its clients including news service Reuters and textiles and chemicals manufacturer Courtaulds.

Granada and ITV
Staunton was appointed to the board of ITV plc on 3 December 2003 after the merger of Granada and Carlton. Previously he served as the Finance Director of Granada Group plc, which he joined in 1993.

Since then, Granada / ITV has:
 acquired London Weekend Television via a £650m hostile takeover (1994);
 acquired motorway catering company Pavilion Leisure (1994);
 acquired Direct Vision Rentals (1994);
 taken over Forte Group via a £3.8 billion tender offer (1996);
 acquired Yorkshire Television and Tyne-Tees TV (1997);
 acquired Anglia TV (2000);
 acquired HTV (2000);
 acquired Meridian TV (2000);
 merged with Compass Group to form Granada Compass plc (2000);
 demerged Granada Media (2000);
 acquired Border TV (2001); and
 merged with Carlton to form ITV (2003).

On 21 September 2005, ITV plc announced that Staunton planned to step down as Finance Director. He resigned from the Board of ITV plc on 29 March 2006, announcing that he planned to "broadly retire".

Non-executive career
Staunton's experience includes non-executive roles as Chairman of Ashtead Group plc, a plant hire company (1997–2004), and as a director of EMAP plc, a consumer magazine and media company. In 2002, Staunton (who had been on the Emap board since 1995) was forced to resign after a government ruling that he could not be on the board of both Granada and Emap.

He has also served on the boards of ITN, a British news broadcaster, and BSkyB - the operator of the UK's largest digital pay television platform - and international fashion retailer New Look Staunton was also a non-executive director of Ladbrokes from September 2006 to May 2010.

He was appointed to the board of Legal & General on 1 May 2004 and served as Vice Chairman and Senior Independent Director until his retirement from the board in May 2013.

He is also a non-executive director of Standard Bank. Staunton was appointed chairman of the Board Audit Committee and a director on 1 December 2005.

In April 2007 The Times reported that Vector, the £2.5 billion hotel real estate investment trust (Reit), was about to unveil a "high-powered set of nonexecutive directors" including Henry Staunton.

He was appointed a non-executive director of The Merchants Trust plc (with effect from 1 May 2008) in April 2008.

In 2010, it was announced he was to join the non-executive boards of WH Smith plc and Capital & Counties Properties.

Other interests
Outside of his business life, Staunton sits on the advisory board of the University of Exeter Business School. He plays Eton Fives and golf. His clubs include Walton Heath Golf Club and the RAC.

References

1948 births
Living people
Businesspeople from London
Alumni of the University of Exeter
People educated at Ipswich School